Dar Salam-Chérif is a village in the rural commune of Kataba I, in the Bignona Department of the Ziguinchor Region of southwestern Senegal. In 2002 it had a population of 937 people.

References

Populated places in the Bignona Department